Lullabies to Paralyze is the fourth studio album by American rock band Queens of the Stone Age, released on March 22, 2005. The album debuted at #5 on the Billboard 200, and sold 97,000 copies in America during its first week of release, eventually topping over 342,000 copies as of March, 2007 according to Nielsen Soundscan. The album has been certified gold in the UK, where it has sold over 100,000 units. It is also the band's first album to be released after bassist Nick Oliveri was fired from the band. Singer/guitarist Josh Homme and singer Mark Lanegan are the only members from the previous album, Songs for the Deaf, to play on this album and it is the first album to feature drummer Joey Castillo and guitarist Troy Van Leeuwen.

Background
The album title Lullabies to Paralyze was intended to bridge Lullabies with its predecessor Songs for the Deaf by naming it after a line in "Mosquito Song", the final track on Songs for the Deaf. The "deluxe limited edition" of the album includes a bonus track and a bonus DVD containing "a look behind the scenes and special bonus footage". Videos were produced for singles "Little Sister", "In My Head" and "Burn the Witch", and the song "Someone's in the Wolf". The video for "Someone's in the Wolf" was featured on the bonus DVD of Lullabies to Paralyze.

The album was delayed during 2004 because of some changes to the line-up: bassist, vocalist, and co-songwriter Nick Oliveri was fired and on-off vocalist Mark Lanegan went on tour with his own band.
Lanegan can still be heard singing on several songs of the album as well as contributing lyrics. Because of this turmoil, there had been rumours that Lanegan had left the band, which Josh Homme eventually clarified in several interviews was never the case. Nevertheless, he encouraged these rumours to draw the attention off the band by giving the press "something to focus on while I was just making the record".

LP versions
The album has three LP pressing runs. The first pressing was released by AntAcidAudio and contains a different cover to the CD version. The sides are named Once, You, Were & Lost, after a line from "Someone's in the Wolf", with each containing a mixture of the CD's album and bonus tracks (with the exception of Once, only the standard tracks are present).

The second pressing is a reissue by Dutch record label Music On Vinyl, released on September 22, 2011. The reissue is different from the first pressing in that it does not have its sides named after the line from "Someone's in the Wolf," and it uses the cover art from the CD release. The reissue omitted bonus tracks "Infinity" and "Precious and Grace" from the track listing, and listed "Like a Drug" as the last track. Side four contains an etching of one of the album's artwork.

The third pressing is due for release in November 2019 and features the tracklist from the original 2005 LP release and the cover art from the original CD release.

Critical reception

The album received generally positive reviews, although slightly lower than its predecessor, the average score being 78 out of 100 on Metacritic based on 31 professional reviews.

Kevin Forest Moreau awarded it 3rd best album of the year 2005, Billboard magazine ranked it 7th best album, Magnet magazine ranked it 9th, and Filter magazine considered it 10th best album of the year 2005.
JustPressPlay ranked it #31 on its list of the Top 100 Albums of the 2000s and named "Tangled Up in Plaid" the 19th best song of the decade.

Commercial performance
Lullabies to Paralyze peaked at number four on the UK Albums Chart and was certified gold in the UK on April 15, 2005 with sales exceeding 100,000 copies. It also became the band's first album to reach the top ten on the US Billboard 200, where it peaked at number seven.

Track listing
All tracks written by Joshua Homme, Troy Van Leeuwen and Joey Castillo, except where noted. All lyrics written by Homme, except additional lyrics on "Medication", "Tangled Up in Plaid" and "Long Slow Goodbye" by Mark Lanegan.

Notes 
 The "Hidden Outro" later appears as the main riff in the song "Running Joke", a b-side that appears on Era Vulgaris.
 The final item on the track list, "The Fun Machine Took a Shit and Died" (located behind the CD in the normal version, or inside the booklet in the deluxe edition), below "Long Slow Goodbye" reads; "The Fun Machine took a shit and died – Was lost or misplaced. (There is a reward for the return of said tapes)". During that time, the band assumed that the tapes of that song were either lost or stolen. A live version of this song can be found on the DVD release Over the Years and Through the Woods. Homme commented, "The tapes got lost. Actually, they were just at another studio, but we falsely accused everyone in the world of theft." The song was later rerecorded as a single and featured as a bonus track on Era Vulgaris.

Personnel

Queens of the Stone Age
 Josh Homme – lead vocals, guitar, bass, piano, drums, percussion, handclaps
 Troy Van Leeuwen – guitar, bass, lap steel, piano, keyboards, handclaps, backing vocals
 Joey Castillo – drums, piano, percussion, handclaps

Guest appearances
 Alain Johannes – guitar on tracks 5-7 and 11, bass on tracks 3, 4 and 9, flute & marxophone on track 9, backing vocals on 12, phone on 14
 Mark Lanegan – lead vocals on "This Lullaby", co-lead vocals on "Precious and Grace" and backing vocals on "Burn the Witch" and "You Got a Killer Scene There Man..."
 Chris Goss – backing vocals on "You Got a Killer Scene There Man...", "Someone's in the Wolf" and "Burn the Witch"
 Billy Gibbons – guitar and backing vocals on "Burn the Witch", guitar and co-lead vocals "Precious and Grace", guitar on "Like a Drug"
 Dave Catching – opening guitar on "The Blood Is Love"
 Jack Black – handclaps and stomps on "Burn the Witch", and is also seen contributing the same for "Broken Box" during the bonus DVD
 Jesse Hughes – flute on "Someone's in the Wolf"
 Shirley Manson – backing vocals on "You Got a Killer Scene There, Man..."
 Brody Dalle – backing vocals on "You Got a Killer Scene There Man..."
 Joe Barresi – triangle on "Tangled Up in Plaid"
 The Main Street Horns – tubas and baritone trombone on "I Never Came", "Someone's in the Wolf" and "Skin on Skin"
 Josh Freese - co-wrote "In My Head"

Charts and certifications

Weekly charts

Year-end charts

Certifications

Singles charts

References

Queens of the Stone Age albums
2005 albums
Albums produced by Joe Barresi
Albums produced by Josh Homme
Interscope Records albums
Albums recorded at Sound City Studios